Rouven Schröder (born October 18, 1975) is a former German football player. Most recently, he worked as Sporting Director of Schalke 04.

Career
He made his debut on the professional league level in the Bundesliga for VfL Bochum on April 1, 2001, when he started in a game against FC Energie Cottbus. Schröder announced on 11 November 2009 his return to VfB Lübeck.

From June 2021 until 26 October 2022, he was Sporting Director of Schalke 04.

References

External links
 

1975 births
Living people
German footballers
VfL Bochum players
VfL Bochum II players
MSV Duisburg players
VfB Lübeck players
Bundesliga players
2. Bundesliga players
Association football defenders
People from Arnsberg
Sportspeople from Arnsberg (region)
Footballers from North Rhine-Westphalia